Österreich or Oesterreich is the German name for Austria (literally "eastern kingdom") and may also be a surname. Notable people with the surname include:

Rolf Österreich (born 1952), former East German figure skater 
Romy Österreich (born 1956), former East German figure skater; partner and later wife of Rolf Österreich
Georg Österreich (1664–1735), German Baroque composer
Traugott Konstantin Oesterreich (1880–1949), German religious psychologist and philosopher

See also
Österreicher (surname)

German-language surnames